Cornwallis Island is one of the Queen Elizabeth Islands, part of the Arctic Archipelago, in the Qikiqtaaluk Region of Nunavut in the Canadian Arctic. At  in size, it is the 96th largest island in the world, and Canada's 21st largest island. Cornwallis Island is separated by the Wellington Channel from Devon Island, and by the Parry Channel from Somerset Island to the south. Northwest of Cornwallis Island lies Little Cornwallis Island, the biggest of a group of small islands at the north end of McDougall Sound, which separates Cornwallis Island from nearby Bathurst Island.

Cape Airy is located at the island's southwestern extremity.

The first European to visit Cornwallis Island was the British Arctic explorer and naval officer Sir William Edward Parry in 1819. The island is named for Royal Navy admiral Sir William Cornwallis.

Cornwallis Island is also home to microbiological colonies known as hypoliths, from their tendency to take hold under ("hypo") stones ("lith").

Several sites on Cornwallis Island including Char Lake and Meretta Lake were key research locations in the International Biological Program and proved foundational to the development of high-latitude limnology.

Demographics
Resolute is Canada's second most northerly public community, after Grise Fiord, and has a population of 183 in 2021. Resolute Bay Airport acts as a transportation hub for the central islands of the high Arctic of Nunavut.

Image gallery

Climate
The island has a polar arctic climate (ET) with long cold winters and short cool summers. Resolute has a very dry climate with an average precipitation of  a year, most of it falling as snow from September to October.

Resolute has never experienced an above-freezing temperature between October 20 and May 6.

Between around April 30 and August 13, Resolute experiences midnight sun; whilst between around November 7 and February 4 there is polar night. Between late November and mid-January, the sun is so low that there is not even civil twilight, with the only exception from complete darkness being a deeper-blue sky called nautical twilight at noon, but there is no true experience of 24 hours of pitch black darkness around noon. For about two weeks before and after the midnight sun in Resolute, the nights are still quite bright since it does not get any darker than civil twilight (this is the twilight where surrounding objects are still visible and outdoor activities can go on without the need for artificial lighting). Resolute, however, does not experience night (the phase of day) from about March 14 to September 29.

Resolute does experience thunderstorms during the summer, but they are typically rare in the region.

References

External links
 Cornwallis Island in the Atlas of Canada - Toporama; Natural Resources Canada

Islands of the Queen Elizabeth Islands
Inhabited islands of Qikiqtaaluk Region